The Marriage of Maria Braun is a 1978 West German drama film directed by Rainer Werner Fassbinder. The film stars Hanna Schygulla as Maria, whose marriage to the soldier Hermann remains unfulfilled due to World War II and his post-war imprisonment. Maria adapts to the realities of post-war Germany and becomes the wealthy mistress of an industrialist, all the while staying true to her love for Hermann.

The Marriage of Maria Braun was one of the more successful works of Fassbinder and shaped the image of the New German Cinema in foreign countries. It has also been acclaimed by critics as Fassbinder’s crowning achievement. It is the first installment of Fassbinder's BRD Trilogy, followed by Lola (1981) and Veronika Voss (1982).

Plot
The film starts in Germany in 1943. During an Allied bombing raid Maria marries the soldier Hermann Braun. After "half a day and a whole night" together, Hermann returns to the Eastern front the following day. Following the end of the war, Maria is informed that Hermann has been killed. Maria starts work as a prostitute in a bar frequented by American soldiers. She has a relationship with African-American soldier Bill, who supports her and gives her nylon stockings and cigarettes. She becomes pregnant by Bill.

However, Hermann was not killed, and returns home to discover Maria and Bill undressing each other. A fight between Hermann and Bill ensues. When Hermann seems in danger, Maria unintentionally kills Bill, striking his head with a full bottle. Maria is tried by a military tribunal and expresses her love for both Bill and Hermann; Hermann is so struck with Maria's devotion that he takes the blame for the killing and is imprisoned. Maria has a stillbirth and asks her doctor to promise to maintain the grave. On the train home, Maria positions herself to catch the eye of a wealthy industrialist, Karl Oswald. Oswald, an older man, offers her a position as his assistant, and shortly thereafter Maria becomes his mistress as she had planned. Maria visits Hermann again and tells him about the development, promising that their life will start as soon as he is released. Maria becomes wealthy and buys a house.

Oswald visits Hermann and offers to make him and Maria heirs to his wealth if Hermann deserts Maria after his release. Neither man tells Maria of their agreement. On release, Hermann emigrates to Canada and sends Maria a red rose each month to remind her he still loves her.

Following Oswald's death, Hermann returns to Germany and to Maria. When Oswald's will is read by Senkenberg, the executor, Maria hears about Oswald's agreement with Hermann. Distressed, Maria and Hermann briefly argue about how they supposedly sacrificed through their whole life for each other, then she goes into the kitchen to light a cigarette from the burner of the stovetop. Maria is offscreen as Hermann is seen watching her, when he lurches away and screams "Nein". Before this, Maria had left the gas stove opened after lighting up a cigarette in the same place. A moment later, the apartment suffers a gas explosion from the stove, killing Maria and Hermann.

Cast

Production

Writing and pre-production
The idea for The Marriage of Maria Braun can be traced to the collaboration of Rainer Werner Fassbinder and Alexander Kluge on the unrealized television project The Marriage of our Parents (Die Ehen unserer Eltern), which was developed after the critical success of the omnibus film Germany in Autumn. Fassbinder worked on a draft screenplay together with Klaus-Dieter Lang and Kurt Raab and presented it in the early summer of 1977 to his longtime collaborator Peter Märthesheimer, who at that time was working as a dramaturge at the Bavaria Film Studios. In August 1977, Märthesheimer and his partner Pea Fröhlich, a professor of psychology and pedagogics, were commissioned to write a screenplay based on the draft together. Although it was Märthesheimer's and Fröhlich's first screenplay their knowledge of Fassbinder's works allowed them to match the screenplay to the characteristic style and structure of Fassbinder's other works. Fassbinder changed only a few details in the completed screenplay, including some dialogue and the end of the film. Instead of Maria Braun committing suicide in a car accident she dies in a gas explosion, leaving it unclear whether she committed suicide or died accidentally.

The producer of the film was Fassbinder's longtime collaborator Michael Fengler with his production company Albatros Filmproduktion. Fengler planned to start shooting the film in the first half of 1978, as Fassbinder's next project Berlin Alexanderplatz was scheduled for June. As Fassbinder was embroiled in a controversy over his stage play Der Müll, die Stadt und der Tod he was not ready for starting to shoot the film and withdrew to Paris, where he worked on the screenplay for Berlin Alexanderplatz. Fengler was dreaming of an international star cast for the film. On his suggestion Fassbinder and Fengler visited Romy Schneider and asked her to play the role of Maria Braun. Due to Schneider's alcohol problems, fickleness, and demands, the role was then given to Hanna Schygulla, her first collaboration with Fassbinder for several years. Yves Montand also showed interest in the film, but wanted to play Maria's husband Hermann and not – as suggested by Fassbinder and Fengler – the industrialist Oswald. As the role of Hermann was already promised to Klaus Löwitsch, Montand was ultimately not offered any role.

Production

From its beginnings, the financing of The Marriage of Maria Braun was precarious. Albatros Filmproduktion only contributed 42,500 DM, the public broadcaster Westdeutscher Rundfunk 566,000 DM, the German Federal Film Board 400,000 DM and the distributor guaranteed another 150,000 DM. This forced Fengler to find another financing partner, offering Hanns Eckelkamp's Trio-Film a share in the film in December 1977. Fengler had promised Fassbinder's Tango-Film a share of 50 percent of the film profits, but as Fengler - by offering Trio-Film a share in the film - effectively oversold the rights only 15 percent of the film right ultimately remained with Fassbinder. Fassbinder subsequently referred to Fengler as gangster and it led to litigations against Fengler that continued even after Fassbinder's death.

Shooting began in January 1978 in Coburg. Bad-tempered and quarrelsome, Fassbinder shot the film during the day and worked on the script to Berlin Alexanderplatz during the night. In order to sustain his work schedule he consumed large quantities of cocaine, supplied by the production manager Harry Baer and the actor Peter Berling. According to Berling this was the main reason why the film went over the budget, as the cash for the cocaine was coming from Fengler.

In February the budget was reaching 1.7 million DM, and two most expensive scenes - the explosions at the beginning and at the end of the film - had not yet been shot. By this time Fassbinder had learned about Fengler's deal with Eckelkamp and the overselling of the film rights. He felt deceived and broke with his longtime collaborator Fengler. He demanded the status of a co-producer for himself and obtained an injunction against Fengler and Eckelkamp. Fassbinder fired most of the film crew, ended the shooting in Coburg at the end of February and then moved to Berlin, where he finished shooting the last scenes. Consequently, the biographer Thomas Elsaesser called the production of the film "one of Fassbinder's least happy experiences" and Berlin "one of the decisive self-destructive episodes in Rainer's life".

Distribution and reception

Release
In parallel to the preparations for the production of Berlin Alexanderplatz Fassbinder worked with film editor Juliane Lorenz on the editing and post-production of The Marriage of Maria Braun. The failure of Despair at the Cannes Film Festival in May 1978 spurred Fassbinder to prepare an answer print overnight and to present the film on 22 May to German film producers in a private screening. Attended by, among others Horst Wendlandt, Sam Waynberg, Karl Spiehs, Günter Rohrbach and the majority shareholder of the Filmverlag der Autoren, Rudolf Augstein the screening was a success. Eckelkamp invested a further 473,000 DM to pay off the debts of the film production and became the sole owner of the rights to the film. Owning all film rights, Eckelkamp negotiated a distribution deal with United Artists, thus outmaneuvering the Filmverlag der Autoren, which was usually distributing Fassbinder's films.

Hoping that The Marriage of Maria Braun might be successful at the 1979 Berlin International Film Festival Eckelkamp started a marketing campaign and decided to release the film theatrically in March. Commissioned by Eckelkamp, the author Gerhard Zwerenz novelized the film. It was published in several weekly installments in the magazine Der Stern from March over a period of three months, thus increasing public interest in the film. The official premiere of the film was on 20 February during the 29th Berlin International Film Festival. The West German theatrical release was on 23 March. At the Berlin International Film Festival Hanna Schygulla won the Silver Bear for Best Actress, which did not satisfy Fassbinder who expected to win the Golden Bear.

Contemporary reception
German film critics responded very positively to the film and praised the film's combination of artistic values with mass appeal. In the weekly newspaper Die Zeit Hans-Christoph Blumenberg called the film "the most accessible (and thus most commercial) and mature work of the director". Karena Niehoff wrote in the daily newspaper Süddeutsche Zeitung that The Marriage of Maria Braun "is a charming and even amusing film, at the same time extraordinarily artful, artificial and full of twists and turns".

Hanna Schygulla was praised by many film critics. In the Süddeutsche Zeitung on 23 March 1979 Gottfried Knapp wrote that the director gave her a magnificent opportunity to display her acting talent, and that her character, emotions, charm and energy had an enormous effect. The film and Hanna Schygulla were also praised by foreign film critics. In The New Yorker, David Denby called Schygulla "an improbable cross between Dietrich and Harlow".  Schygulla, too, was the runner-up for the National Society of Film Critics Award for Best Actress that year, losing to Sally Field for Norma Rae.

François Truffaut commented in 1980 in the Cahiers du cinéma that with this film Fassbinder "has broken out of the ivory tower of the cinephiles", and that the film is "an original work of epic and poetic qualities" influenced by Godard's Contempt, Brecht, Wedekind and Douglas Sirk and particularly touching is his idea of a man who looks on men and on women with equal fondness. The French film critic Jean de Baroncelli discussed the allegorical qualities of the film in Le Monde on 19 January 1980 and wrote that the film presents Maria Braun with a "shining simplicity" as an allegory of Germany, "a character, that wears flashy and expensive clothes, but has lost her soul".

Roger Ebert added the film to his Great Movies collection.

The New York Times placed the film on its Best 1000 Movies Ever list.

Commercial success and aftermath
The Marriage of Maria Braun was not only a critical, but also a commercial success. From its release until October 1979 more than 900,000 tickets were sold in West Germany, and was shown for up to 20 weeks in some film theaters.
 In West Germany alone the film grossed more than $3 million. In the same year of its German release the distribution deals for 25 countries were negotiated. In August 1981 the film was the first film by Fassbinder to be shown in East German film theaters. In the United States, the film was the highest-grossing German film ever and grossed $2.6 million.

The film was not the official German submission to the 51st Academy Awards for Best Foreign Language Film. Instead Hans W. Geißendörfer's The Glass Cell was chosen to be the official German submission. Almost one year later the film was nominated for a Golden Globe Award for Best Foreign Language Film at the 37th Golden Globe Awards, but this success was overshadowed by the success of Volker Schlöndorff's The Tin Drum at the 52nd Academy Awards. The commercial success of The Marriage of Maria Braun strengthened the negotiation position of Fassbinder in his subsequent film projects. He received a financing agreement for one of his favorite projects based on Pitigrilli's novel Cocaine and was able to increase the budget for Berlin Alexanderplatz. Several German commercial film producers expressed an interest in making films with Fassbinder. The seasoned film producer Luggi Waldleitner would produce the Fassbinder film Lili Marleen with Hanna Schygulla in the main role. Horst Wendlandt would produce the two other films in the BRD Trilogy, Lola and Veronika Voss. His success also allowed him to realize his last project, Querelle which was co-financed by Gaumont.

As Fengler had oversold the rights to the film, the profit share of Fassbinder was an open question. Eckelkamp saw himself as the sole owner of all rights, but sent a check in the amount of 70,000 DM to Fassbinder in 1982 to appease the director. After Fassbinder's death his mother and heiress Liselotte Eder revived the claims, but was rejected by Eckelkamp. In the course of legal proceedings Eckelkamp was ordered in 1986 to disclose the film's finances to the newly founded Rainer Werner Fassbinder Foundation. Eckelkamp's Trio Film disclosed a budget of almost 2 million DM, additional marketing costs of 1 million DM and a net profit of 1 million DM. When Trio-Film was ordered to pay to Fassbinder's heirs 290,000 DM Eckelkamp refused. At the request of the Rainer Werner Fassbinder Foundation Trio Film had to declare bankruptcy in 1988. In the course of the continuing legal proceedings, the Oberlandesgericht Düsseldorf certified in 1990 that Fassbinder was not a co-producer of the film. The ruling was upheld by the Federal Court of Justice, but also ruled that the Fassbinder heirs were entitled to a share of the film's profits. Today all film rights are owned by the Rainer Werner Fassbinder Foundation.

References
Notes

Bibliography
  (screenplay)
  (novel based on the film)
 

Further reading
 Anton Kaes. From Hitler to Heimat: The Return of History as Film. Cambridge, Massachusetts: Harvard University Press, 1989.

External links
 
 
 Die Ehe der Maria Braun at Film Portal 
 Die Ehe der Maria Braun at the Rainer Werner Fassbinder Foundation's Official Website 
A Market for Emotions: The Marriage of Maria Braun Production History an essay by Michael Töteberg at the Criterion Collection

1978 films
1978 drama films
German drama films
West German films
1970s German-language films
Films about race and ethnicity
Films about Nazi Germany
Films directed by Rainer Werner Fassbinder
Adultery in films
German pregnancy films
Films set in Germany
Films set in West Germany
Films shot in Berlin
Films produced by Michael Fengler
Films set in the 1940s
Films set in the 1950s
Films set in 1954
1970s German films